Fumarole minerals are minerals which are deposited by fumarole exhalations. They form when gases and compounds desublimate or precipitate out of condensates, forming mineral deposits. They are mostly associated with volcanoes (as volcanic sublimate or fumarolic sublimate) following deposition from volcanic gas during an eruption or discharge from a volcanic vent or fumarole, but have been encountered on burning coal deposits as well. They can be black or multicoloured and are often unstable upon exposure to the atmosphere.

Native sulfur is a common sublimate mineral and various halides, sulfides and sulfates occur in this environment associated with fumaroles and eruptions. A number of rare minerals are fumarole minerals, and at least 240 such minerals are known from Tolbachik volcano in Kamchatka, Russia. Other volcanoes where individual fumarole minerals have been discovered are Vulcano in Italy and Bezymyanny also in Russia.

Origin and appearance 

 In fumaroles, minerals either form through desublimation from fumarole gases or through interactions of fumarole gases with country rock. The former are known as sublimates and the latter as incrustations. Some such deposits may also form through the interaction between liquid fumarole condensates and country rock and are not always formed by desublimation. Multiple cycles of primary deposition and secondary alteration may occur. Volcanic gases such as hydrogen chloride, hydrogen fluoride, sulfur dioxide and water can transport large amounts of elements, thus contributing to geochemical cycles on the surface and the formation of ore deposits at depth. When these exhalations reach the atmosphere and cool, the minerals contained in them tend to precipitate out.

Volcanic fumarole minerals (as volcanic sublimate or fumarolic sublimate) form following deposition from volcanic gas during an eruption or discharge from a volcanic vent or fumarole. Burning coal produces enough heat to partially melt rocks and to generate exhalations of the mineral components embedded in coal. Coal seam fires often deposit fumarolic minerals over areas of a few square metres which can be detected by airborne hyperspectral imagery. Coal fires can mobilize toxic trace elements. Fumarole minerals have also been found in Gusev crater on Mars.

Fumarole deposits have been used to identify heat flow anomalies and to reconstruct ore genesis processes.

Fumarole exhalations are often black or multicoloured, and tend to develop typical zonations. Common components are sulfur compounds and elemental sulfur. In the Valley of Ten Thousand Smokes in Alaska the fumarole minerals form both thin crusts in the vents, mixtures with tephra deposits and coloured outcrops and mounds at the sites of former fumaroles. Deposits at Tolbachik volcano have shapes likef crusts, small plates and globules.

Typical components of fumarole minerals are halides, oxides, sulfates and sulfides, with the exact composition different between volcanoes, individual vents at volcanoes and different temperatures of the same vent. Fumarolic minerals are often unstable and are eroded or decompose, in the Valley of Ten Thousand Smokes in Alaska it took less than a century for almost all fumarole mineral deposits to disappear although others remained and were later used to identify former fumarole vents. Thus, many fumarole minerals are rare and many rare minerals are fumarole minerals. Some fumarolic minerals have been found in extinct Cenozoic volcanoes and could exist in Archean rocks as well, however. Unique textures occur such as bubble-like structures, which may form when the liquid that deposits the minerals evaporates.

Volcanoes 

Research on the mineralogy of fumarole minerals has been conducted in Central America, Russia and Europe, with detailed publications on Izalco in El Salvador, Eldfell in Iceland, Vesuvius where research goes back to the early 19th century and Vulcano in Italy, Mount Usu in Japan, Kudryavy and Tolbachik in Russia, Kilauea and Mount St. Helens in the United States. Sulfur deposits containing fumarolic desublimates are found at Guallatiri and Lastarria volcanoes in the Central Volcanic Zone of the Andes. Kudryavy volcano in the Kurils is particularly known for the numerous mineralizations its fumaroles have produced and for the presence of rhenium-rich precipitates. Among the elements found there are copper-gold-silver alloys. Various sulfate-based minerals have been identified at the Salton Buttes in California. Fumarolic minerals have also been reported from the Western Andes in Bolivia.

The most fumarolic minerals have been found at Tolbachik volcano in Kamchatka, Russia; Tolbachik also has one of the most diverse mineral assemblages in the world. The high temperature and oxidizing regime of exhalations which transport the elements at Tolbachik facilitates mineral deposition. A large assemblage of silicates and a number of copper-zinc selenite chlorides and copper-based fumarolic minerals were discovered at Tolbachik volcano, Kamchatka, Russia. Many of these include polymeric  units. About 240 minerals have been identified at Tolbachik, close to a record, 40 of them only incompletely studied. Elemental gold linked to chlorides at Tolbachik has been interpreted as gold transported by chlorine-rich oxidizing environments. Specimens of fumarole minerals from Tolbachik and Kudryavy are hosted by the Fersman Mineralogical Museum in Moscow.

Historical lava flows of Vesuvius volcano contain fumarolic minerals. Various fumarole minerals have been discovered at Vulcano volcano in Italy, where the mineralogy has changed since 1987 and 1990 due to hotter fumarole exhalations, yielding increased sulfate and sulfur salt concentrations. Fumarolic minerals have also been encountered at mud volcanoes in Siberia.

Minerals discovered in fumarole areas 

List of fumarole minerals with discovery site and year:
 Abramovite, Kudryavy, Russia. Reported in 2008.
 Allochalcoselite.
 Aluminocoquimbite, Grotta del' Alume, Vulcano, Italy. Reported in 2010.
 Aluminopyracmonite, La Fossa, Vulcano, Italy. Reported in 2018.
 Arsmirandite, Arsenatnaya fumarole, Tolbachik, Russia. Discovered in 2020.
 Axelite, Arsenatnaya fumarole, Tolbachik, Russia. Reported in 2022.
 Baliczunicite, La Fossa, Vulcano, Italy. Discovered in 2013.
 Belomarinaite, Toludskoe lava field, Tolbachik, Russia. First described in 2019.
 Belousovite, Yadovitaya fumarole, Second Scoria Cone, Tolbachik, Russia. Reported in 2018.
 Blossite, Izalco, El Salvador. Reported in 1987.
 Bubnovaite, Naboko cone, Tolbachik, Russia.
 Cadmoindite, Kudryavy, Russia. Reported in 2004.
 Calciolangbeinite, Arsenatnaya fumarole, Tolbachik, Russia. Reported in 2022.
 Campostriniite, La Fossa, Vulcano, Italy. Reported in 2015.
 Cannizzarite, La Fossa, Vulcano, Italy.
 Cesiodymite, Second Scoria Cone, Tolbachik, Russia. Reported in 2018.
 Chubarovite, Arsenatnaya fumarole, Tolbachik, Russia. Reported in 2015.
 Cryptocalcite, Second Scoria Cone, Tolbachik, Russia. Reported in 2018.
 Cupromolybdite, New Tolbachik scoria cones, Tolbachik, Russia. Reported in 2012.
 D'ansite Vesuvius and Vulcano, Italy. Reported in 2012.
 Demartinite, La Fossa, Vulcano, Italy. Reported in 2007.
 Demicheleite ( and ), La Fossa, Vulcano, Italy. Reported in 2010 and 2008, respectively.
 Dobrovolskyite, Great Tolbachik fissure eruption, Kamchatka peninsula, Russia. Announced in 2021.
 Elasmochloite.
 Eldfellite.
 Ermakovite, Fan-Yagnob coal deposit, Tajikistan. Reported in 2022.
 Grigorievite,, Second Scoria Cone, Tolbachik, Russia. Formally approved in 2015.
 Hermannjahnite (Naboko scoria cone, Tolbachik, Russia. Reported in 2018.
 Karpovite (First Cinder Cone, Tolbachik, Russia. Reported in 2018.
 Knasibfite, La Fossa, Vulcano, Italy. Reported in 2008.
 Koksharovite,, Bezymyanny, Russia. Formally approved in 2015.
 Kudriavite, Kudryavy, Russia. Reported in 2004.
 Lehmannite, Arsenatnaya fumarole, Tolbachik. Discovered in 2020.
 Leonardsenite, Eldfell, Heimaey, Iceland. Formally approved in 2015.
 Lesyukite, First Cone, Tolbachik, Russia. Publication in 2007 or earlier.
 Lucabindiite, La Fossa, Vulcano, Italy. Described in 2010–2011.
 Majzlanite, Yadovitaya fumarole, Tolbachik, Russia. Described in 2019.
 Medvedevite, Toludskoe lava field, Tolbachik, Russia. Found in 2020.
 Nishanbaevite, Arsenatnaya fumarole, Tolbachik, Russia. Described in 2022.
 Oskarssonite,, Eldfell, Iceland. Reported in 2018.
 Ozerovaite, Second Cinder Cone, Tolbachik, Russia. Reported in 2019.
 Paradimorphite, Solfatara, Campi Flegrei, Italy. Reported in 2022, a variant of 
 Parageorgbokiite, Yadovitaya fumarole, Tolbachik, Russia. Described in 2007.
 Parascandolaite, Vesuvius, Italy. Published in 2014.
 Parawulffite, Arsenatnaya fumarole, Tolbachik, Russia. Described in 2014.
 Petrovite, Second Scoria Cone, Tolbachik, Russia. Formally approved in 2020.
 Pliniusite, Tolbachik, Russia. Reported in 2022.
 Prewittite, Second Scoria Cone, Tolbachik, Russia. Reported in 2013.
 Pseudolyonsite, New Tolbachik scoria cones, Tolbachik, Russia. Reported in 2011.
 Puninite, Second scoria cone, Tolbachik, Russia. Published in 2017.
 Rhabdoborite, Arsenatnaya fumarole, Tolbachik, Russia. Reported in 2020.
 Russoite (Solfatara, Phlegrean Fields, Italy. Published in 2018.
 Sbacchiite, Vesuvius, Italy. Reported in 2019.
 Shcherbinaite, Izalco, El Salvador. Reported in 1983 and named after another discovery in Russia.
 Stoiberite, "Y fumarole", Izalco, El Salvador. Reported in 1979.
 Therasiaite (La Fossa, Vulcano, Italy. Reported in 2014.
 Thermessaite (La Fossa, Vulcano, Italy. Announced in 2021.
 Topsøeite, Hekla, Iceland. Announced in 2018.
 Wulffite, Arsenatnaya fumarole, Tolbachik, Russia. Described in 2014.
 Vasilseverginite, Arsenatnaya fumarole, Tolbachik, Russia. Announced in 2021.
 Wrightite, Second Scoria Cone, Tolbachik, Russia. Discovered in 1983.
 Yavapaiite.
 Ziminaite, Bezymyanny, Russia. Reported in 2018.
 Zincobradaczekite, Yadovitaya fumarole, Tolbachik, Russia. Described in 2020.

References

Sources 

 
 
 
 
 
 
 
 
 
 
 
 
 
 

Fumaroles
Minerals